Dalakhay is a rural locality (an ulus) in Zakamensky District, Republic of Buryatia, Russia. The population was 427 as of 2010. There are 5 streets.

Geography 
Dalakhay is located 102 km north of Zakamensk (the district's administrative centre) by road. Sanaga is the nearest rural locality.

References 

Rural localities in Zakamensky District